Joseph Birech is a Kenyan long distance runner who won the bronze medal at the 2010 Commonwealth Games in the 10,000 meters race  He has also won multiple Great Scottish Run titles.

References

Date of birth missing (living people)
Living people
Kenyan male long-distance runners
Year of birth missing (living people)
Commonwealth Games medallists in athletics
Commonwealth Games bronze medallists for Kenya
Athletes (track and field) at the 2010 Commonwealth Games
Medallists at the 2010 Commonwealth Games